The Franklin R. Lanter House is a historic house located at 562 West Park Street in Olathe, Kansas.

Description and history 
The two-story, wood-framed house was built in 1901 for Franklin R. Lanter, a lumber and coal merchant. It was designed by architect George P. Washburn in the Queen Anne style, especially Free Classicism. Lanter lived in the house until 1919. It was later converted into apartments, and eventually remodelled as a single-family residence.

It was listed on the National Register of Historic Places on October 10, 2007.

References

Houses on the National Register of Historic Places in Kansas
Houses in Johnson County, Kansas
Houses completed in 1901
1901 establishments in Kansas
Queen Anne architecture in Kansas